Theron Metcalf (October 16, 1784 – November 12, 1875) was an American attorney and politician from Massachusetts. He was a New England jurist and served as an associate justice of the Massachusetts Supreme Judicial Court.

Personal life
Metcalf was born in Franklin, Massachusetts, the son of Hanan Metcalf and Mary (Allen) Metcalf. He graduated from Brown University in 1805, and studied law at the Litchfield Law School after graduation.

On November 5, 1809, he married Julia Tracy, daughter of United States Congressman Uriah Tracy. Metcalf and his wife had three children: George Tracy Metcalf, William Pitt Metcalf and Julia Metcalf. Metcalf died in Boston, Massachusetts on November 12, 1875.

Career

Metcalf edited the Dedham Gazette from 1813 to 1819. The editor was Jabez Chickering.

Legal
He opened a law school in Dedham in 1828 where he gave lectures. He was appointed Reporter of the Massachusetts Supreme Court in 1839, and sat on the bench of that court from February 24, 1848, until his resignation on August 31, 1865. His annotations were considered valuable for their philosophical investigation and discriminating analysis.

He was admitted to the bar in Massachusetts in 1807, and moved to Dedham, Massachusetts in 1809 to practice law.  He served as Norfolk County Attorney for twelve years, until the position was eliminated.

Metcalf defended the arsonist who admitted to burning down the Phoenix Hotel. In the case of Baker v. Fales, he served alongside Samuel Haven in representing a group of church members who objected to the hiring of a minister at the First Church and Parish in Dedham.

Political
In 1815, he was appointed Reporter of Contested Elections for that year. In 1831, 1833 and 1834, he served as a member of the Massachusetts House of Representatives, and was chairman of the Judiciary Committee.

Honors
Brown gave him the degree of LL.D. in 1844, and Harvard University did the same in 1848.  He was elected a member of the American Antiquarian Society in 1844.

In 1832 and 1847, he was elected a fellow of Brown University. He delivered an address before the Phi Beta Kappa Society of Brown in 1832, and in 1840 delivered the Fourth of July oration at Dedham. Metcalf donated a set of fifty volumes of ordination sermons that he had collected to Brown University.

Published works
His publications include:
 A Digest of the Cases decided in the Supreme Judicial Court of Massachusetts from 1816 to 1823, including the Five last Volumes of Tyng's and the first of Octavius Pickering's Reports (Boston, 1825)
 Reports from 1840 till 1849 (13 vols., 1840–51)
 the first volume of Digest of Decisions of Courts of Common Law and Admiralty in the United States (1840)
 a Supplement to the Revised Statutes of Massachusetts till 1844, with Luther S. Cushing (1844)
 articles to The American Jurist on the "Law of Contracts."

Edited works
His edited works include:
 Asahel Stearns and Lemuel Shaw, The General Laws of Massachusetts till 1822 (2 vols., 1823)
 George Maule and William Selwyn's Reports
 Russell on Crimes
 Starkie on Evidence
 Yelverton's Reports

References

Works cited

External links

	

1784 births
1875 deaths
19th-century American writers
American legal writers
American male non-fiction writers
Brown University alumni
People from Franklin, Massachusetts
Members of the Massachusetts House of Representatives
Politicians from Boston
Litchfield Law School alumni
Massachusetts lawyers
Justices of the Massachusetts Supreme Judicial Court
Lawyers from Boston
Members of the American Antiquarian Society
19th-century American male writers
19th-century American judges
Lawyers from Dedham, Massachusetts
19th-century American politicians
19th-century American lawyers